Mairi Forsyth (born 8 July 1991) is a Scottish rugby union player. She is currently a member of the Scotland women's national rugby union team.

Rugby career 
She debuted for Scotland national team in 2018 against Canada, and in 2019 began playing for Corstorphine Cougars. She has played for Murrayfield Wanderers under-18s and Scotland at under-18 and 20 levels.

She was named to the 2020 Women's Six Nations team.

Personal life 
Forsyth is a Peterhead Academy principal teacher of maths and physics. She played at Grangemouth Rugby Club with her sister, Jemma, after previously playing at club level and academy, and receiving A caps together, though never playing together for Scotland.

References 

Living people
1991 births
Scottish female rugby union players